Mykola Burachek (or Buraček) (March 16, 1871 in Letychiv, Podillia Guberniya (now Khmelnytskyi Oblast) – August 12, 1942, in Kharkiv) was a Ukrainian Impressionist painter and pedagogue.

Biography 
Burachek studied at the Kiev School of Drawing with Khariton Platonov (late 1890s) and with Jan Stanisławski at the Kraków Academy of Fine Arts (1905–1910). He also studied in Paris, in the studio of Henri Matisse (1910–1911). His first exhibition was in 1907.

In 1917–1922 he taught at the Ukrainian Academy of Arts in Kiev and then at the Kiev State Art Institute and the Mykola Lysenko Music and Drama School in Kiev. Then he moved to Kharkiv and became the rector of the Kharkiv Art Institute (1925). In 1934, he returned to Kiev and taught at the Kiev State Art Institute.

Burachek also worked for theaters as a stage designer. In 1934, he worked for the Kharkiv theaters, designing stages for the plays Marusia Churai by Ivan Mykytenko and Set Your Heart Free by Marko Kropyvnytsky. In 1937, he worked with Donetsk theaters.

A virtuoso landscape painter, he painted Impressionist landscapes devoted to the Ukrainian themes such as Morning on the Dnieper (1934), Apple Trees in Bloom (1936), and The Broad Dnieper Roars and Moans (1941).

Writings 
Burachek also worked as a writer and art historian, among his works are:

 Moie zhyttia (My Life, 1937),
 Yuriy Dujenko. Mykola Burachek. Kyiv, Mistectvo, 1967.
 Velykyi narodnyi khudozhnyk (The Great National Artist, 1939, a monograph on Taras Shevchenko),
 Essays about Oleksander Murashko, Mykola Samokysh, Serhii Vasylkivsky, Mykhailo Zhuk, and other artists.

Selected paintings

References

External links 
 Mykola Burachek at WikiCommons
 Biography of Burachek - in English

1871 births
1942 deaths
People from Letychiv
20th-century Ukrainian painters
20th-century Ukrainian male artists
Ukrainian Impressionist painters
Painters from the Russian Empire
Russian male painters
Jan Matejko Academy of Fine Arts alumni
Academic staff of the National Academy of Visual Arts and Architecture
Ukrainian male painters